Thomas Talbot (July 19, 1771February 5, 1853) was an Irish-born Canadian soldier and colonial administrator. He founded the community of Port Talbot, Ontario, which was at one time the most prosperous town in the region due to his insistence on building quality roads, and was responsible for enticing 50,000 people to settle in the Thames River area.

Background
Talbot was born at Malahide Castle in County Dublin, Ireland. He was the fourth son of Richard Talbot and Margaret Talbot, 1st Baroness Talbot of Malahide (see the Baron Talbot of Malahide). Richard Talbot, 2nd Baron Talbot de Malahide and Sir John Talbot were his elder brothers.

Early military career
Talbot received a commission in the army as ensign before he was twelve years old, and was appointed at sixteen to aid his relative, the Lord Lieutenant of Ireland. He saw active service in Holland and at Gibraltar.

Canada
Talbot immigrated to Canada in 1791, where he became personal secretary to John Graves Simcoe, Lieutenant-Governor of Upper Canada. After returning to England, Talbot convinced the government to allow him to implement a land settlement scheme along the shore of Lake Erie. It was May 21, 1803, that he landed at a spot which has been called since Port Talbot, and built a log cabin. Nearby, he added a sawmill, a cooper shop, a blacksmith shop, and a poultry house along with a barn. When settlers began to arrive in 1809, Talbot added a gristmill as well.

Here he ruled as an absolute, if erratic, potentate, doling out strips of land to people of his choosing, a group that emphatically did not include supporters of the American Revolution, liberals or anyone insufficiently respectful. He wanted permanent and compact settlement.

The result of the road-making provision was that the settlement became noted for its good roads, especially for that named Talbot Road. By the late 1820s Colonel Thomas Talbot had organized the construction of a  road linking the Detroit River and Lake Ontario as part of a grand settlement enterprise in the south western peninsula. By 1820, all of the land originally allotted to Talbot had been taken up. Many, if not most, of the settlers were American. He had placed about 20,000 immigrants on the Talbot settlement by 1826.

Because he had done his work so well, the government placed the southwestern part of the province under his charge. This afforded Talbot the opportunity of extending the Talbot road from the Long Point region to the Detroit River. In 1823, Talbot decided to name the port after his friend Edward Smith-Stanley, 14th Earl of Derby, whose son, Frederick would become Canada's governor general and donate to the ice-hockey world the trophy that still bears his name. According to returns placed before the House of Assembly in 1836, title to some  located in twenty-nine townships had at one time gone through his hands.

Talbot's administration was regarded as despotic. He was infamous for registering settlers' names on the local settlement map in pencil and if displeased, was alleged to have erased their entry. However, his insistence on provision of good roads (notably the eponymous Talbot Trail), maintenance of the roads by the settlers, and the removal of Crown and clergy reserves from main roads quickly resulted in the Talbot Settlement becoming the most prosperous part of the province. Eventually, however, he began to make political demands on the settlers, after which his power was reduced by the provincial government. Talbot's abuse of power was a contributing factor in the Upper Canada Rebellion of 1837.

Talbot's home in Port Talbot was called Malahide (which was demolished in 1997, generating much public outcry from heritage preservationists). Talbot died in the home of George Macbeth at London, Ontario, in 1853 and is interred in the cemetery of St. Peters Anglican Church near Tyrconnell, Ontario, in Elgin County. Talbot eventually moved to London where he lived until his death in 1853. When he died in 1853, at age 82, he had been visited at his historic home on Lake Erie by General Isaac Brock, Francis Gore, Mrs. Anna Jameson, Sir Peregrine Maitland, Sir John Colborne, Chief Justice Sir John Beverley Robinson, his brother the Honourable Peter Robinson, Dr. William Dunlop, Bishops Stuart and Strachan, Sir George Arthur, the Duke of Richmond, Lord Aylmer and many others. He lies buried at Port Talbot overlooking his beloved Lake Erie.

Talbotville (a community in Southwold, Ontario) and the city of St. Thomas, Ontario, were named after him, as well as Colonel Talbot Road and Talbot Street in both London and St. Thomas.

References

Further reading

External links 
 City of London Web site
 City of St. Thomas Web site
 
 
 Coyne, James H. 1849–. The Talbot Papers: Edited, With Preface, Introduction And Some Annotations. Ottawa: Printed for the Author by the Royal Society of Canada, 1908.  Subjects: Thomas Talbot (1771–1853); History of Port Talbot (Ontario).  Full text available online.

1771 births
1853 deaths
Immigrants to Upper Canada
Irish emigrants to pre-Confederation Ontario
Members of the Legislative Council of Upper Canada
Younger sons of barons